Marjorie is a female given name derived from Margaret, which means pearl. It can also be spelled as Margery, Marjory or Margaery. Marjorie is a medieval variant of Margery, influenced by the name of the herb marjoram. It came into English from the Old French, from the Latin Margarita (pearl). After the Middle Ages this name was rare, but it was revived at the end of the 19th century.

Short forms of the name include Marge, Margie, Marj and Jorie.

People 
Marjorie, Countess of Carrick (also Margaret) (1253–1292), mother of Robert the Bruce
Marjorie Abbatt (1899–1991), English toy maker and businesswoman
Marjorie Acker (1894–1985), American artist
Marjorie Agosín (born 1955), American writer, activist, and professor
Marjorie Anderson (1913–1999), British actress and BBC radio broadcaster
Marjorie Ogilvie Anderson (1909–2002), Scottish historian and paleographer
Marjorie Arnfield (1930–2001), English landscape artist
Marjorie Barnard (1897–1987), Australian writer, critic, and librarian
Marjorie Barretto (born 1974), actress and politician from the Philippines
Marjorie Bates (1882–1962), British painter
Marjorie Bean (died 2001), first Bermudian woman to be appointed to its Legislative Council
Marjorie Beaucage (born 1947), Métis filmmaker
Marjorie Bennett (1896–1982), Australian actress
Marjorie Best (1903–1997), American costume designer
Marjorie Bick (1915–2013), Australian biochemist and environmental scientist
Marjorie Blamey (1919–2019), English painter and illustrator
Marjorie Blankstein (née Rady), Canadian fundraiser, community activist, and volunteer
Marjorie Bonner (19th century actress), American actress
Marjorie Bonner (Ziegfeld Follies), American dancer and actress
Marjorie Boulton (1924–2017), British writer in English and Esperanto
Marjorie Bowen (1885–1952), British author
Marjorie Bransfield, American actress
Marjorie Brown, American businesswoman and owner of the Boston Celtics 
Marjorie Browne (1910–1990), British actor
Marjorie Lee Browne (1914–1979), African-American mathematics educator
Marjorie Bruce or Marjorie de Brus (1296–1316), eldest daughter of Robert the Bruce, King of Scots
Marjorie Cameron (1922–1995), American artist, occultist, and actress; wife of rocket pioneer Jack Parsons
Marjorie Harris Carr (1915–1998), American conservationist
Marjorie Constance Caserio (1929–2021), American chemist
Marjorie Sewell Cautley (1891–1954), American landscape architect
Marjorie Chibnall, English historian, medievalist and Latin translator
Marjorie Clapprood (born 1949), Massachusetts politician and talk show host
Marjorie Clark (1909–1993), South African track and field athlete
Marjorie Clarke, American environmental scientist
Marjorie Cohn, American professor of law
Marjorie Kowalski Cole (1953–2009), American author
Marjorie Cottle, British motorcycle sports rider
Marjorie Cotton (1913–2003), Australian children's librarian
Marjorie Courtenay-Latimer (1907–2004), South African museum official who in 1938 publicized the existence of the coelacanth
Marjorie Cox Crawford, Australian tennis player
Marjorie Critten, Miss Missouri in 1958
Marjorie Crocombe (1930–2022), author and academic from the Cook Islands
Marjorie Dannenfelser, American anti-abortion activist, president of the Susan B. Anthony List
Marjorie Daw (actress) (1902–1979), American film actress of the silent era
Marjorie de Sousa (born 1980), Venezuelan model and actress
Marjorie Deane (1914–2008), British financial journalist and author
Marjorie Deanne (1917–1994), American film actress
Marjorie Housepian Dobkin (1922–2013), American author and professor of English
Marjorie Dodd, American tennis player and golfer in the early 20th century
Marjorie Dunn, British horn player
Marj Dusay (1936–2020), American actress
Marjorie Estiano (born 1982), Brazilian actress and singer
Marjorie Evasco (born 1953), Filipino poet
Marjorie Eyre (1897–1987), English opera singer
Marjorie Fielding (1892–1956), British stage and film actress
Marjorie Finlay (1928–2003), American opera singer and television personality
Marjorie Flack (1897–1958), American artist and writer of children's picture books
Marjorie Fleming (1803–1811), Scottish child writer and poet
Marjorie Franklin, American conceptual artist and art professor
Marjorie Franklin (1887-1975), British psychoanalyst
Marjorie Garber (born 1944), American author and professor
Marjorie Gateson (1891–1977), American character actress in films of the 1930s and 1940s
Marjorie Gestring (1922–1992), American springboard diver and Olympic gold medallist
Marjorie Gordon (1893–1983), English actress and singer
Marjorie Graves (1884–1961), British civil servant, Conservative politician and writer
Marjorie Grene (1910–2009), American philosopher
Marjorie Griffin, Irish camogie player
Marjorie Gross (1956–1996), Canadian television writer and producer
Marjorie Gubelmann (born 1969), American businesswoman, owner and CEO of Vie Luxe International
Marjorie Guthrie (1917–1983), American dancer and dance teacher
Marjorie Hahn (born 1948), American mathematician and tennis player
Marjorie Halpin (1937–2000), U.S.-Canadian anthropologist
Marjorie Harris (born 1937), Canadian non-fiction writer
Marjorie Silliman Harris (1890–1976), American philosopher
Marjorie Hall Harrison (1918–1986), British astronomer
Marjorie Heins, American lawyer, activist, writer, and founder of the Free Expression Policy Project
Marjorie Henzell (born 1948), Australian politician
Marj Heyduck (1913–1969), American newspaper reporter, columnist and editor and radio show host
Marjorie Hill (1886–1909), American, a founder of Alpha Kappa Alpha Sorority, Inc. at Howard University
Marjorie Holt (1920–2018), Republican U.S. Congresswoman for Maryland
Marjorie Hughes (born 1925), American singer in the Frankie Carle Orchestra
Marjorie Hume (1900–1976), English film actress
Marjorie Husted (1892–1986), American home economist who helped develop the brand character Betty Crocker
Marjorie Jackson-Nelson (born 1931), Governor of South Australia and Australian athlete
Marjorie Johnson, American baker, the "Blue Ribbon Baker" from Minnesota
Marjorie Joyner (1896–1994), African American inventor and businesswoman
Marjorie Kane (1909–1992), American film actress
Marjorie Keller (1950–1994), American experimental filmmaker, author, activist, and film scholar
Marjorie Kellogg (1922–2005), American author
Marjorie B. Kellogg, American writer, author of Dragon Quartet
Marjorie Lajoie, Canadian ice dancer
Marjorie Lane, American singer and Broadway performer of the 1920s and 1930s
Marjorie Lawrence (1907–1979), Australian soprano
Marjorie Leeming (1903–1987), Canadian tennis player, badminton player and teacher
Marjorie Lewty (1906–2002), British author of romance novels
Marjorie Linklater (1909–1997), Scottish campaigner of the arts and environment
Marjorie Linton (1917–1994), Canadian backstroke and freestyle swimmer who competed in the 1932 Summer Olympics
Marjorie Liu, American author of paranormal romance and urban fantasy novels and comic books
Marjorie Lord (1918–2015), American television and film actress
Marjorie Luesebrink, American teacher and author of hypermedia fiction
Marjorie Oludhe Macgoye (1928–2015), English/Kenyan novelist, essayist and poet
Marjorie Main (1890–1975), American character actress
Marjorie Margolies (born 1942), American women's rights activist and educator, member of the U.S. House of Representatives
Marjorie Matthews (1916–1986), American Bishop of the United Methodist Church
Marjorie Maxse (1891–1975), British political organiser and the first female chief organization officer of the Conservative Party
Marjorie McIntosh (born 1940), American historian of Great Britain
Marjorie Batchelder McPharlin (1903–1997), American puppeteer and authority on puppet theater
Marjorie Merryman (born 1951), American composer, author, and music educator
Marjorie Mikasen (born 1959), American painter
Marj Mitchell (1948–1983), Canadian curler
Marjorie Monaghan, American actress
Marjorie Montgomery (1912–1991), American child dancer and actress
Marjorie Morgan (1915–2007), Canadian writer and author
Marjorie Hope Nicolson (1894–1981), American literary scholar
Marjorie Noël (1945–2000), French pop singer, represented Monaco in the 1965 Eurovision Song Contest
Marjorie Oelrichs (1908–1937), American socialite
Marjorie Okell (1908–2009), track and field athlete from Great Britain
Marjorie Ozanne (1897–1973), Guernsey author in Guernésiais, bird hospital founder
Marjorie Parker (died 1991), Australian civic and political activist
Marjorie Perloff (born 1931), Austrian-born U.S. poetry criticGuernésiais
Marjorie Pickthall (1883–1922), Canadian writer born in England
Marjorie Pierce (1900–1999), American architect 
Marjorie Pizer (1920–2016), Australian poet
Marjorie Merriweather Post (1887–1973), American socialite and the founder of General Foods, Inc.
Marjorie Pratt, Countess of Brecknock (died 1989), British peeress
Marjorie Priceman (born 1958), American author and illustrator of children's books
Marjorie Proops (1911–1996), British newspaper columnist and agony aunt
Marjorie Quennell (1884–1972), British historian, illustrator and museum curator
Marjorie Rambeau (1889–1970), American film and stage actress
Marjorie Kinnan Rawlings (1896–1953), American author
Robert and Marjorie Rawlins, American philanthropists and patrons of the arts, particularly music
Marjorie Rendell (born 1947), federal judge and former First Lady of Pennsylvania
Marjorie Reynolds (1917–1997), American film actress
Marjorie Rhodes (1897–1979), British actress
Marjorie Rice (1923–2017), American amateur mathematician
Marjorie Scardino (born 1947), American-British CEO of Pearson PLC
Marjorie Schick (1941–2017), American jewelry artist and academic
Marjorie Schwarzer (born 1957), American museum writer and educator
Marjorie W. Sharmat (1928–2019), American children's writer
Marjorie Shostak (1945–1996), American anthropologist
Marjorie Lynette Sigley (1928–1997), British artist, writer, actress, teacher, choreographer, theatre director and television producer
Marjorie Silcoff, Canadian actress, a cast member on the Canadian sketch comedy TV series You Can't Do That on Television
Marjorie Sinclair, Baroness Pentland (1880–1970), daughter of Sir John Campbell Hamilton-Gordon
Marjorie Parker Smith (1917–2009), American champion ice skater in dance and figure skating competitions
Marjorie Spock (1904–2008), American environmentalist, author and poet
Marjorie Strider (1934-2014), American painter, sculptor and performance artist
Marjorie Hewitt Suchocki (born 1933), American author and emerita professor  of theology
Marjorie Sweeting, British geomorphologist specialising in karst phenomena
Marjorie Tallchief (1926–2021), American ballerina of the Osage Nation
Marjorie Taylor (1912–1974), British stage and film actress
Marjorie Taylor Greene (born 1974), American politician and businesswoman
Marjorie Thomas (1923–2008), English opera and oratorio singer
Marjorie Thompson (1954–2014), American biologist and musician
Marjorie Tipping MBE (1917–2009), Australian historian and patron of community services
Marjorie Torrey (1891–1964), American illustrator and author of children's books
Marjorie Tuite (1922–1986), Dominican nun from New York City
Marjorie R. Turnbull (born 1940), representative in Florida's House of Representatives
Marjorie van Vliet (1923–1990), American teacher and aviator
Marjorie Vincent, former journalist and beauty contestant who was crowned Miss America 1991
Marjorie Wallace (born 1954), American model turned television presenter
Marjorie Wallace (SANE) (born 1945), British writer, broadcaster and investigative journalist; chief executive of SANE
Marjorie Weaver (1913–1994), American film actress of the 1930s through the early 1950s
Marjorie Welish (born 1944), American poet, artist, and art critic
Marjorie Westbury (1905–1989), English radio actress and singer
Marjorie Wheeler-Barclay, American historian and university professor 
Marjorie Whitaker (1895–1976) (pseudonym Malachi Whitaker), English writer noted for short stories and an autobiography
Marjorie White (1904–1935), Canadian-born actress of stage and film
Marjorie M. Whiteman (1898–1986), American expert on international law
Marjorie Williams (1958–2005), American writer, reporter, and columnist
Marjorie Williamson (1913–2002), British academic, physicist, and university administrator
Marjorie Willison, Canadian author of books on gardening and a radio personality
Marjorie Muir Worthington (1900–1976), American author of novels and short stories
Marjorie Yang (born 1952), non-official member of the Executive Council of Hong Kong
Marjorie Yates (born 1941), British actress known for role in the Channel 4 drama Shameless

Fictional characters 
 Marj Brasch, on the New Zealand soap opera Shortland Street
 the imaginary title character of "Marjorie Daw", a short story by Thomas Bailey Aldrich
 Marjorie Dean, protagonist of a series of books for girls by Josephine Chase
 Marjorie Morgenstern, title character of Marjorie Morningstar, a 1955 novel by Herman Wouk and the 1958 film adaptation of the same name
 Marge Simpson, from the TV series The Simpsons

See also
Marjory
Margery (disambiguation)

English feminine given names
Given names derived from gemstones